Solomon Schindler (1842–1915) was a rabbi and author.

Biography
He was born at Neisse, Germany on April 24, 1842, and was educated at Breslau. He married Henrietta Shutz on June 24, 1868, and they had four children.

After emigrating to the United States in 1871, he served as minister of congregations at Hoboken, New Jersey, and in Boston, Massachusetts (at Temple Israel) until 1894. He was also a member of the Boston School Board during 1888–1894.  During 1895–1899 he was superintendent of the Federation of Jewish Charities of Boston and thenceforth until 1909, when he retired, served as superintendent of the Leopold Morse Home. 
He also became a Baal teshuva.

He died in Boston on May 5, 1915, and was buried at Temple Israel Cemetery in Wakefield, Massachusetts.

Works
 Messianic Expectations and Modern Judaism (1886)
 Dissolving Views of the History of Judaism (1888)
 Young West: A Sequel to Bellamy's Looking Backward (1894)

References
  
  
 

1842 births
1915 deaths
American Orthodox rabbis
American theologians
Baalei teshuva
German emigrants to the United States
German Orthodox rabbis
People from the Province of Silesia
People from Nysa, Poland
20th-century American rabbis
19th-century American rabbis